is a range of beers made by the  in , a commune of the , in far northern France, just to the west of Belgium. The original  is a  style amber ale, created in 1922.

External links
Official site
Confrérie of Jenlain beer
Le Festibière - Photos by Christophe Tondeux

Beer in France
Nord (French department)